Chalbaaz is a 2018 Indian Bengali romantic comedy film directed by Joydip Mukherjee. The film stars Bangladeshi Superstar Shakib Khan and Subhashree Ganguly in the lead roles. The cast also includes Rajatabha Dutta, Kharaj Mukherjee, Kazi Hayat, Syed Hasan Imam, Atul Sharma and Ashish Vidyarthi. The film is produced by Old Theatre Limited. The film is a remake of 2015 Telugu movie Subramanyam for Sale. The film is released in India on 20 April 2018. And Released in Bangladesh on 27 April 2018. The film received generally positive reviews from critics. It topped the box office in its opening week.

The film was also the third collaboration between Shakib Khan and Joydeep Mukherjee pair after huge success of the films Shikari and Nabab and the third collaboration between Shakib Khan and Eskay Movies, second time pairing with Shakib-Subhashree and director Joydeep Mukherjee with Subhashree Ganguly after successful Nabab.

Plot
Raja (Shakib Khan) is a money minded youth who goes to the UK to earn big bucks. One fine day, he comes across Srijata (Subhashree Ganguly) who ditches her family for her long time boyfriend. As time passes by, Srijata gets cheated by her boyfriend big time and is left stranded in London. Twist in the tale arises when Srijata requests Raja to come along with her to Kolkata and clear the chaos which was created by her elopement. What will Raja do now ? That forms the rest of the story.

Cast
 Shakib Khan as Raja Chowdhury
 Subhashree Ganguly as Srijata
 Rajatava Dutta as Bhojohori Manna / Bhoja Da, Raja's assistant; chef of  Indian Standard Institute (currently known as Bureau of Indian Standards)
 Shantilal Mukherjee - Pappu Mallick, Mallick family's enemy
 Sagnik Chatterjee as Bikram, Priya's brother; who went to keep his father's word, became desperate to marry his sister to Raja
 Joydip Mukherjee as Rajshekhar Dutt, Vinay's father and competition organiser; Later he came to India from UK to marry his son to Sunita, the youngest daughter of the Mallick family.
 Subrata as Thakurbabu; Raja's father
 Rebeka Rouf as Raja's step mother
 Shiba Shanu as Tota, Vikram's gang
 Mahmudul Islam Mithu
 Rajdeep Ghosh
 Shahed Ali
 Shikha Khan Mou as Aruna Mallick, Adinath Mallick's wife
 Jadu Azad
 Honey Bafna
 Amit Ganguly
 Jayanta Hore
 Panchanan Ghatak
 Manoshi Sengupta as Priya, Vikram's sister and Raja's fiance
 Rumpa
 Ashish Vidyarthi as Adinath Mallick, Srijata's paternal uncle; Who is currently the head of the Mallick family
 Momo Shiuly
 Reshma
 Priyanti Gomes
 Papiya
 Dhiman
 Mridul Sen
 Atul Sharma as Competition Judge
 Rene Costa as Airport Security
 Kumud Pant as Chef
 Charlotte Dunnico as Marie
 Tatiana Zarubova as Competition Participant

Soundtrack 
The soundtrack of Chalbaaz is composed by Savvy, while lyrics of the film songs are penned by Priyo Chattopadhyay. The first song from the movie, the title song "Chalbaaz", is sung by Shadaab Hashmi. The Title song "Chalbaaz" was released as a promotional single on 8 March 2018. the Video Song "Aish Kori" was released on YouTube on 15 March 2018 and was well received by Critics and Audiences. The Third Video Song "Projapoti Mon" was released on YouTube on 23 March 2018 and Tor Premer Brishtite sung by Armaan Malik and Madhubanti Bagchi Released on 29 March 2018.

References

External links 
 

2018 films
2018 romantic comedy films
Indian romantic comedy films
Bengali remakes of Telugu films
Bengali-language Indian films
2010s Bengali-language films
Films directed by Joydip Mukherjee